Brush Creek is a  tributary of the Raystown Branch Juniata River in Fulton and Bedford counties, Pennsylvania, in the United States.

Brush Creek flows down a valley between Polish Mountain and Rays Hill, and enters the Raystown Branch several miles west of Breezewood.

Bridges
The Feltons Mill Covered Bridge and Jacksons Mill Covered Bridge cross Brush Creek.

Tributaries
Shaffer Creek

See also
List of rivers of Pennsylvania

References

Rivers of Pennsylvania
Tributaries of the Juniata River
Rivers of Bedford County, Pennsylvania
Rivers of Fulton County, Pennsylvania